A severe heat wave with temperatures as high as  struck southern Pakistan in June 2015. It caused the deaths of about 2,000 people from dehydration and heat stroke, mostly in Sindh province and its capital city, Karachi. The heat wave also claimed the lives of zoo animals and countless agricultural livestock. The event followed a separate heat wave in neighboring India that killed 2,500 people in May 2015.

Recorded temperatures
Extreme temperatures started to grip Pakistan's southern areas on 18 June 2015, and peaked on 20 June:

Karachi recorded its highest temperatures since 1979.

Contributory factors

Asif Shuja, the former director general of the Pakistan Environmental Protection Agency, claimed the heat wave was a symptom of global climate change, aggravated by deforestation, expansion of asphalt superhighways, and rapid urbanisation. Shuja went on to say that the lack of sophisticated weather prediction technology in Pakistan contributed to the casualties of the heat wave.

Moreover, widespread failures of the electrical grid left many locations without working air-conditioners, fans, or water pumps, adding further to the death toll. Prime Minister Nawaz Sharif tasked a committee comprising Abdul Qadir Baloch, a retired General of the Pakistan Army and Minister for States and Frontier Regions, together with State Minister for Health Sciences Regulation and Coordination Saira Afzal Tarar. The two Ministers visited Karachi's Jinnah Postgraduate Medical Centre in the wake of deaths due to the severe heat wave. Speaking to the media during their visit, Baloch said that the K-Electric was being investigated for load shedding. Baloch held the K-Electric, KW&SB and Sindh government responsible for the increase in heat wave mortality in Karachi. The power regulator NEPRA reported that K-Electric was not generating electricity according to its generation capacity.

The heat wave coincided with the month of Ramadan, when Muslims observe fasting and no drinking from dawn till dark. This increased the risks of dehydration and heat stroke.

Emergency measures
Prime Minister Nawaz Sharif declared a state of emergency, activated military relief efforts, and warned electric supply companies that he would not tolerate power outages during Ramadan. The Sindh government declared an emergency for all government hospitals in the province, and the University of Karachi postponed its exams for at least one month. An influential Muslim cleric in Pakistan decreed a fatwa that if "a religious and qualified doctor" advises (for safety of life), Muslims are allowed to skip or break their Ramadan daytime fast, and then to complete those days of fasting when Ramadan and the emergency have passed. At the peak of the June 2015 heat wave, the number of corpses exceeded local capacities for storage or burial, as the emergency efforts proved insufficient to prevent enormous loss of life.

See also
2017 Pakistan heat wave
List of extreme weather records in Pakistan

References

2015 disasters in Pakistan
2015 heat waves
Heat waves in Pakistan
History of Karachi (1947–present)